Christina Brabetz (* born 8 October 1993 in Windhoek, Namibia) is a South African-German violinist.

Biography 
Christina Brabetz, born in 1993, attended the German School in Cape Town and won her first musical awards in local and national competitions and was soon acclaimed as the „most promising candidate“. At the early age of eleven she was able to demonstrate her virtuosity by playing at the famous „Hugo Landbrechts Concert Festival“. Two years later she was admitted to the University of Music Detmold  to study with Prof. Thomas Christian. The peak of her career up to now was to win the highly remunerated TONALi GRAND PRIX, which led to a performance of Mendelssohns Violin Concerto with Kurt Masur as conductor and engagements at the Festspiele Mecklenburg-Vorpommern, the BASF concerts and other music festivals.

Instrument 
Christina Brabetz plays on a violin of Paolo Antonio Testore from 1860.

Prizes and honors
 2004 Winner of Junior String section and most promising candidate at SANLAM NATIONAL MUSIC COMPETITION
 2005 Winner of the silvermedal at the SANLAM NATIONAL MUSIC COMPETITION
 2003-2006 Winner of several Gold awards at the South African Eisteddfodds
 2010 Winner of the TONALi Grand Prix in Hamburg
 2012 Special Award from Nordrhein-Westfalen for young artists

References

External links 
Christina Brabetz`s homepage
Christina Brabetz´s management homepage

Brabetz, Christina
Brabetz, Christina
Brabetz, Christina
People from Windhoek
Hochschule für Musik Detmold alumni
21st-century classical violinists
Women classical violinists